Joyce Haber (1931–1993) was an American gossip columnist who worked for the Los Angeles Times.

Haber was one of Hollywood's last powerful gossip columnists who "were capable of canonizing a film or destroying a star". She took over the old job of Hedda Hopper.

Haber left the Times in 1976 to write a roman a clef titled The Users. It was her only novel, rose to the top of the New York Times Bestseller List, and was made into a tele-film with the same name.

She was married to television producer Douglas S. Cramer from 1966-1972 and had two children, Douglas S. Cramer III and Courtney Cramer, with him. In 1994, Cramer attempted to produce a two-act play about their marriage entitled The Last Great Dish but failed to get it off the ground.

Haber was instrumental in an FBI black-op that led to the suicide of actor Jean Seberg. According to Washington Post journalist Betty Medsger (The Burglary: The Discovery of J. Edgar Hoover's Secret FBI, published 2014), Haber agreed in 1970 to plant an unfounded rumour in her column to the effect that Seberg's pregnancy was the result of a liaison with a leader of the Black Panther Party. This was to be in retaliation for Seberg's public support of the Black Panther Party. Seberg miscarried shortly afterwards, and thereafter suffered from depression which ultimately led to her suicide in 1979.

Filmography

References

American columnists
American women novelists
1931 births
1993 deaths
American women non-fiction writers
American women columnists
20th-century American women
20th-century American people